General Perry may refer to:

Edward A. Perry (1831–1889), Confederate States Army brigadier general
Nick Perry (British Army officer) (born c. 1972), British Army major general
Scott Perry (politician) (born 1962), Pennsylvania Army National Guard brigadier general
William F. Perry (1823–1901), Confederate States Army brigadier general